Richard Jackson may refer to:

Arts and entertainment
Richard Jackson (theatrical producer) (born 1932), British theatrical producer and agent
Richard Jackson (artist) (born 1939), American contemporary artist
Richard Jackson (choreographer) (born 1979), choreographer for Lady Gaga and reality television personality
Richard Jackson (musicologist) (born 1936), American musicologist and music librarian
Richard Lee Jackson (born 1979), American actor

Politicians
Richard Jackson (Sudbury MP) (1688–1768), British MP for Sudbury in 1734
Richard Jackson (colonial agent) (c. 1721–1787), British lawyer, colonial agent and politician
Richard Jackson (Coleraine MP) (c. 1729–1789), Irish politician, MP for Coleraine 1751–1789
Richard Jackson Jr. (1764–1838), United States Representative from Rhode Island
Sir Richard Downes Jackson (1777–1845), Administrator of Canada West and Canada East, 1841–1842
Richard Jackson (Liberal politician) (1850–1938), British Member of Parliament for Greenwich, 1906–1910
Richard E. Jackson (born 1945), first African American mayor of a city in New York State and former New York State Commissioner of Motor Vehicles

Science
Richard Jackson (biochemist), biochemist and cell biologist
Richard H. Jackson (geographer) (born 1941), geography professor at Brigham Young University

Sportsmen
Dick Jackson (c. 1878–?), English footballer and manager
Dick Jackson (baseball) (1897–1939), American baseball player
Richard Jackson (footballer, born 1900) (1900–?), English footballer for Rotherham
Rich Jackson (born 1941), American football player
Richard Jackson (cricketer) (born 1979), English cricketer
Richard Jackson (footballer, born 1980), English footballer for Derby County
Rick Jackson (born 1989), American basketball player

Others
Richard H. Jackson (1866–1971), admiral in the United States Navy
Sir Richard Jackson (police officer) (1902–1975), Assistant Commissioner of the London Metropolitan Police, 1953–1963
R. M. Jackson (Richard Meredith Jackson; 1903–1986), British jurist and legal scholar
Richard Jackson (bishop) (born 1961), Church of England Bishop of Lewes

See also
Ricky Jackson (disambiguation)
 Richie Jean Jackson (1932–2013), American author, teacher, and civil rights activist